Carlos Manuel Gonçalves Patrício (born 9 October 1964) is a retired long-distance runner from Portugal, who won the 1993 edition of the Vienna Marathon. He represented his native country in the men's 10,000 metres at the 1996 Summer Olympics. He set his personal best time (2:11:57) in the Half Marathon on 27 September 1998 in Uster.

Achievements

References

1964 births
Living people
Portuguese male long-distance runners
Athletes (track and field) at the 1996 Summer Olympics
Olympic athletes of Portugal
Place of birth missing (living people)